Khanali Darrehsi (also Romanized as Khān‘alī Darrehsī and Khān‘alī Darrahsī) is a village in Angut-e Sharqi Rural District, Anguti District, Germi County, Ardabil Province, Iran. At the 2006 census, its population was 31, in 13 families.

References 

Towns and villages in Germi County